Portea filifera is a plant species in the genus Portea.

The bromeliad is endemic to the Atlantic Forest biome (Mata Atlantica Brasileira) and to Bahia state, located in southeastern Brazil.

References

filifera
Flora of Bahia
Flora of the Atlantic Forest